Keperra railway station is located on the Ferny Grove line in Queensland, Australia. It serves the Brisbane suburb of Keperra.  The station was opened in 1932.

Services
Keperra station is served by all stops Ferny Grove line services from Ferny Grove to Roma Street, Park Road, Coopers Plains and Beenleigh.

Services by platform

References

External links

Keperra station Queensland Rail
Keperra station Queensland's Railways on the Internet
[ Keperra station] TransLink travel information

Railway stations in Brisbane
Railway stations in Australia opened in 1932